Springbank Secondary College (formerly known as Pasadena High School) is a public high school in the suburb of Pasadena in southern Adelaide, South Australia. The inclusive school is on the corner of Goodwood Road and Daws Road. Springbank is a specialist basketball school. In 2017 it also adopted a science, technology, engineering, arts and maths focus, and announced formal links with the Australian Science and Mathematics School and Flinders University.

The school's basketball academy is led by Brendan Mann - said to be one of the best junior players ever to play in SA. Mann played over 200 NBL games for Canberra, Brisbane and Newcastle. He has coached in Europe and was a FIBA scout for the 2017 Under 19 Men’s World Cup.

Springbank has a high-ranking ice hockey team, Springbank Sabres, which has won numerous awards, and a dedicated disability unit in an inclusive model where the students with disabilities learn and socialise alongside their mainstream peers. It also offers "Doorways 2 Construction", run in collaboration with the Construction Industry Training Board (CITB), TAFE and ATEC. The program is offered to Year 11 and 12 students through the Inner South Curriculum Alliance.  Students complete 10 units of course work developed by the CITB as part of its Certificate I in General Construction program.

Community 
The school is home to the historic Tower Arts Centre, the South Australian Light Opera Society and the Sturt Sabres Basketball Club.

Springbank’s oval is utilised by the community - Cumberland United FC's junior teams train there, and the nearby Colonel Light Gardens Primary School uses the oval for all its cricket training and games.

History 
Springbank opened in 1965 as Daws Road High School and operated under this name until 2001, when it was renamed Pasadena High School. It changed its name again on 8 February 2019 when it re-launched as a small school by design for up to 450 students.

At one point this school had an enrolment upwards of 1200. However, after a steady decline, it had 148 students in 2015, this fell further to 110 by early 2017 after a move to amalgamate the school with Unley High School was voted down by parents.  By 2020 the school’s numbers had increased, however, remained the lowest student numbers for Adelaide high schools at 174 students.

In 2017 the school was awarded $10 million for refurbishment works from the state government's Building Better Schools initiative. In 2018 the school released an initial plan showing the funds would be spent on upgrading core buildings, adding a sports science centre linked to the current school's basketball stadium and improving the overall look and feel of the school.

In 2020 the school community won a grassroots battle to save the school from government closure and secured its long-term future through the guarantee of the $10 million capital upgrade. At that time the government made Springbank into an unzoned school, meaning anyone in South Australia could apply to attend. Simultaneously the zone of Unley High School was extended.

Notable alumni

 Andrea Chaplin, Australian fencer, Dual Olympian
 Brad Newley, Dual Olympic basketball player
 Danyle Pearce, former AFL footballer
 Glenn Ridge, former Sale of the Century host and radio presenter
 Kate Ellis, former Federal MP
Jason McDermid – trumpeter with Tom Jones, Peter Gabriel, Amy Winehouse
 Joe Ingles  - Olympic basketballer
 John Schumann - Redgum musician
 Liam Macdonald, actor
Martin Hamilton-Smith, former state MP
 Scott Ninnis, Basketballer and former Adelaide 36ers coach
 Scott Welsh, former AFL footballer
 Tania Gooley Humphry, Olympic beach volleyball player
 Tracy Mann, actress
 Wayne Phillips, Australian cricket player

References

External links 
 Official website

Educational institutions established in 1965
Public schools in South Australia
Special interest high schools in South Australia
1965 establishments in Australia
High schools in South Australia